Huaihua railway station is a railway station in Huaihua built in 1972. It is on the Shanghai–Kunming railway, Jiaozuo–Liuzhou railway, and Chongqing–Huaihua railway.

History 
A new station building was opened on 15 January 2007.

References

See also
Huaihua South railway station

Railway stations in Huaihua
Railway stations in Hunan
Railway stations in China opened in 1972